Pauline monastery may refer to:
 Monastery of St Lawrence at Buda
 Monastery of Jasna Góra
 Monastery of Sveta Jelena
 Monastery of Kékes
 Pauline Monastery of Márianosztra
 Church of the Assumption of the Blessed Virgin Mary (Crikvenica)